The Armageddon Factor is the sixth and final serial of the 16th season of the British science fiction television series Doctor Who, which was first broadcast in six weekly parts on BBC1 from 20 January to 24 February 1979. It was the last to feature Mary Tamm as Romana.

The serial is set on the planets Atrios and Zeos, and another planet in between them. In the serial, the war between Atrios and Zeos is nearing its end. Mentalis, a commandant computer on Zeos, and the Marshal of Atrios (John Woodvine), plot to wipe each other out. At the same time, the Shadow (William Squire), a henchman of the Black Guardian (Valentine Dyall), steals the time and space vessel the TARDIS, which contains the first five segments of the powerful Key to Time, and kidnaps Princess Astra of Atrios (Lalla Ward), who is the sixth and final segment.

Plot 
Searching for the final segment of the Key to Time, the Fourth Doctor and Romana arrive on the planet Atrios, which has endured a recent bombing by their neighbouring planet Zeos, with whom they are at war. The Doctor finds that Zeos is deserted save for the giant computer Mentalis, which is controlling the war. He also discovers that the true opponent is a third planet called the Planet of Evil, ruled by "the Shadow". The Shadow, an agent of the Black Guardian, has Princess Astra of Atrios captive, threatening to torture her if she doesn't give him the location of the final segment of the Key to Time.

On the Planet of Evil, the Doctor encounters another Time Lord, Drax, who he last met at the Academy. Drax has been employed under duress by the Shadow but agrees to help the Doctor. The Doctor leads a servant of the Shadow, known as a Mute, to his TARDIS and opens the door, but is suddenly shrunk to tiny size by Drax, who then shrinks himself using the dimensional stabiliser from his own TARDIS. Drax had misinterpreted the Doctor's plan and shrank the Doctor instead of the Mute.

The Mute returns to the Shadow with the Key, and the Doctor realises why the Shadow has requested it: Astra is the final segment, and is transformed in front of everyone. Using their diminished size, the Doctor and Drax smuggle themselves into the Shadow's lair inside of K9, who pretends to still be under the Shadow's power.  Drax again uses the stabiliser, this time to return them to their normal size.  The Doctor snatches the partially assembled Key and the final segment, and disappears with Romana and K9 in the TARDIS, assembling the Key after setting up a shield around Zeos to deflect the Marshal's missiles towards the Shadow's base, destroying it.

The White Guardian appears to congratulate the Doctor on finding and assembling the Key to Time, and requests that it be sent to him. However, the Doctor, realising that it is actually the Black Guardian in disguise, orders the Key to re-disperse. Enraged, the Black Guardian threatens to kill him. In an attempt to evade him, the Doctor fits a randomiser into the TARDIS guidance system, sending it to an unknown location in time and space, leaving the Doctor with no idea of where they are headed, and the Guardian being unable to follow.

Broadcast and reception

Paul Cornell, Martin Day, and Keith Topping gave the serial an unfavourable review in The Discontinuity Guide (1995), describing it as "a dreary end-of-season Oh-my-God-the-money's-run-out 'spectacular'" without subtle acting. In The Television Companion (1998), David J. Howe and Stephen James Walker wrote that The Armageddon Factor was "entertaining enough in itself, with some good direction by Michael Hayes and generally fine production values, but ultimately fails to tie up all the loose ends and leaves the over-arching plot strangely unresolved". They praised the Shadow but felt that the other characters were one-dimensional, and called the ending a "cop-out". In 2011, Patrick Mulkern of Radio Times stated that the serial "hugely disappoints, yet it's not an unmitigated disaster". He criticised the characterisation and much of the plot, but praised the direction and the Shadow. On the other hand, DVD Talk's Justin Felix gave the serial four out of five stars, saying that it "packs more of a wallop than the previous two stories" and had everything typical of Doctor Who. Felix also called it Mary Tamm's best performance.

Commercial releases

In print
A novelisation of this serial, written by Terrance Dicks, was published by Target Books in June 1980.

Home media
Along with the rest of season sixteen, it was released on DVD in North America as part of the Key to Time box set in 2002, only available in Region 1. A remastered limited edition Key to Time box set was released in Region 2 in the United Kingdom on 24 September 2007. It contains more extras than the previously released US set. This remastered set was released in Region 1 on March 3, 2009.

References

External links

Target novelisation

Fourth Doctor serials
Doctor Who serials novelised by Terrance Dicks
1979 British television episodes
Television episodes written by Bob Baker (scriptwriter)